Farpoint is an American science-fiction convention held since 1993 in Hunt Valley, Maryland. The convention is fan-run, differentiating it from larger, profit-making ventures. Typical programming includes panel discussions, a competitive masquerade, fan videos, an art show, filking and celebrity guest appearances. It is a successor convention to ClipperCon(1984-1989) and OktoberTrek (1990-1992). The most recent Farpoint was held on February 8–10, 2019.

Locations and Dates

*Attendance does not include dealers and guest numbers

**Convention was not held

History

From 1993 to 1997 the convention was held in the Hunt Valley Inn. In 1998 the convention was held in the Baltimore Omni. After 1998, the convention went back to the Hunt Valley Inn until 2008. Farpoint was created by Beverly Ott Volker in early 1993. This convention was successor to other Beverly Volker creations such as Clippercon and Oktobertrek. The convention started in October 1993, which had over 1,300 attendees. The convention continued in October until October 2000 when the committee decided to move the convention to February. This decision caused there to be no 2001 convention because it would only be a four-month span without the convention. The date change coincided with the committee decision to feature fan interests prominently alongside the celebrity guests. Farpoint programming was moved into individual tracks that focus on fans' many interests: Authors/Writing, Science, New Media (fan-created podcasting/film/webcomics), Media (movies and television), Live Performances (theater/music/comedy), Costuming and Cosplay (Masquerade) and Youth/Children. In 2003, the convention was nicknamed "SnowPoint" because the guests, attendees, and committee found themselves locked in the Hunt Valley Inn due to a massive amount of snow. This was also Beverly Volker's last convention, as she died the May of that year. Due to rising prices, in 2009, Farpoint moved to the then Crowne Plaza of Baltimore North, currently named the Radisson Hotel North Baltimore.  Due to issues with the hotel changing management so often in the past 5 years, and other issues with the hotel, the Convention moved again after the 2017 convention.

In 2018, the convention moved back to the Hunt Valley Inn, which itself has technically undergone yet another name change with ownership back to Marriott, and is now known as the Delta Hotels by Marriott Baltimore Hunt Valley. Most convention goers will still call it the Hunt Valley Inn. With the move back to the "Hunt Valley Inn", the normal weekend Farpoint usually was scheduled for in February, President's day weekend, was already taken by another customer in a multi-year contract, moving Farpoint to another weekend in February. As the convention continues to thrive, Farpoint may be able to regain their normal February weekend and take advantage of that three day weekend on President's Day.

References

External links
Farpoint Convention Official Website

Farpoint Convention on Fanlore

Science fiction conventions in the United States
Timonium, Maryland
Recurring events established in 1993
1993 establishments in Maryland